Ariston '80 (Football)
 D.S.W.Z. Broach (Sailing)
 Delftsche Studenten Rugby-Club (Rugby)
 D.F.C. (Fencing)
 D.S.5 (Skating, Surfing, Snowboarding)
 Delftsche Studenten Aeroclub (Gliding)
 D.S.A.V. de Delvers (Athletics)
 D.S.B.A. USSR (Badminton)
 D.S.B.V. Punch (Basketball)
 DSEA (Esports)
 D.S.H.C. (Hockey)
 D.S.H.V. Torius (Handball)
 D.S.K.V. Paal Centraal (Korfbal)
 D.S.R. Proteus-Eretes (Rowing)
 D.S.R.V. Laga (Rowing)
 D.S.S.B.C. "Paris" (Chess and Bridge)
 D.S.S.V. ELS ('Effe Lekker Schaatsen') (Ice skating)
 D.S.T.V Obvius (Tennis)
 D.S.T.V. Trinity (Triathlon)
 D.S.V.V. Punch (Volley)
 Delftse Studenten Zwemvereniging 'WAVE' (Swimming and Water polo)
 Delft Barons (Lacrosse)
 Delft Dragons (American football)
 Delft Hitmanics (Baseball, Softball)
 Force Electro (Frisbee)
 Kratos '08 (Volley)
 S.H.C. Scoop (Hockey)
 S.V.A.C. Yeti (Climbing)
 S.V.H.C. Dopie (Hockey)
 S.V.R.C. (Rugby)
 S.V.T.V. Tenniphil (Tennis)
 S.W.V. Plankenkoorts (Windsurfing)
 SoSalsa! (Salsa)
 S.R.C. Thor (Rugby)
 V.V. Tutor (Futsal)
 W.T.O.S. ('Wij Trainen Ons Suf') (Cycling)
 Wushu Delft (Chinese martial arts)

Delft University of Technology